The Mary P. Dolciani Award is an award established in 2012 by the Mathematical Association of America. The award recognizes a pure or applied mathematician with a record of distinguished contributions to K-16 mathematics education in the United States or Canada and comes with a $5,000 award. Examples of significant contributions include, but are not limited to, the development of K-16 mathematics curriculum, educational technology, or programs to improve teaching or teacher preparation. The prize is funded by a grant established by mathematician, educator, and author Mary P. Dolciani, who dedicated her career to improving mathematics education and is the author of several secondary- and college-level mathematics textbooks.

It should be distinguished from the Mary P. Dolciani Prize for Excellence in Research, awarded beginning in 2019 by the American Mathematical Society.

Award recipients 

2020
Henry O. Pollak, Columbia University
2019
Joseph Gallian, University of Minnesota Duluth
2018
Al Cuoco, Distinguished Scholar, Education Development Center
2017
 Tatiana Shubin, San Jose State University
2015
 Sybilla Beckmann, University of Georgia
2014
 Alan H. Schoenfeld, University of California at Berkeley
2013
 Hyman Bass, University of Michigan
2012
 William G. McCallum, University of Arizona

References 

 Mathematics awards